The Marymount Single Member Constituency is a single member constituency (SMC) located in the central area of Singapore formed in 2020. The current Member of Parliament (MP) is Gan Siow Huang of the People's Action Party (PAP).

Town council

Marymount SMC is managed by the Bishan-Toa Payoh Town Council.

Members of Parliament

Electoral results

Elections in 2020s

References

Singaporean electoral divisions
Ang Mo Kio
Bishan, Singapore
Toa Payoh
Constituencies established in 2020